"Little Egypt (Ying-Yang)" is a 1961 rock song written by Jerry Leiber and Mike Stoller and was recorded by the Coasters for their 1962 album, Coast Along with the Coasters. The song reached #16 on the R&B chart and #23 on The Billboard Hot 100 in 1961.

Cover versions
Elvis Presley in the film and on the 1964 soundtrack album Roustabout and the 1968 NBC Comeback Special
The Downliners Sect on their 1964 album, The Sect
Cher
Nathan Cavaleri, with Chris Bailey on his 1992 single release
Mickey Gilley, 1966
Ray Stevens, 1969
Kaleidoscope on their 1976 album When Scopes Collide <ref>

References

1961 singles
Songs written by Jerry Leiber and Mike Stoller
The Coasters songs
Elvis Presley songs
Cher songs
1961 songs
Atco Records singles